Cladostephus is a genus of marine brown alga.

References 

Brown algae
Brown algae genera